Graeme Churchill (born 20 July 1987) is a Scottish former football striker who played for Falkirk and Stirling Albion.

External links

1987 births
Living people
Scottish footballers
Association football forwards
Falkirk F.C. players
Scottish Premier League players
Scottish Football League players
Stirling Albion F.C. players
Bo'ness United F.C. players
Footballers from Glasgow